Nuit Regular is the chef and co-owner of four restaurants in Toronto. She was named one of “The 20 Most Influential Female Chefs and Restaurateurs Right Now.”

Biography
She grew up in Pai, Thailand.  Regular did not like cooking when she was young but was expected to help out in the kitchen.  She met her husband, Jeff Regular, when he was traveling in Thailand. At the time, she was a nurse.  Together she and Regular opened a restaurant called the Curry Shack where she would cook at night after her nursing job. Eventually she enjoyed cooking more than nursing.

In 2006, the couple moved to Toronto where she studied English and for nursing license.  Jeff’s father approached her about opening a restaurant in a building he owned. That resulted in the restaurant SukhoThai.

Career
Regular is the executive chef and do-owner of PAI Northern Thai Kitchen, Kiin, Sabai Sabai, and SukhoThai.  She has been a judge on Wall of Chefs, a Food Network Canada show.

Awards and honors
On the basis of the authenticity of the food at three of her restaurants, the Thai government awarded her the Thai Select Signature.

References

Nuit Regular
Canadian women chefs
Nuit Regular
Canadian women nurses
Women restaurateurs
Canadian restaurateurs
Nuit Regular
Businesspeople from Toronto
Chefs from Toronto
Year of birth missing (living people)
Living people